The San Juan Skyway Scenic and Historic Byway is a  All-American Road, National Forest Scenic Byway, and Colorado Scenic and Historic Byway located in Dolores, La Plata, Montezuma, San Juan, and San Miguel counties, Colorado, USA. The byway forms a loop in southwestern Colorado traversing the heart of the San Juan Mountains. The San Juan Skyway reaches its zenith at Red Mountain Pass at elevation . Mesa Verde National Park was one of the original UNESCO World Heritage Sites. The Silverton Historic District and the Telluride Historic District are National Historic Landmarks. 

It roughly parallels the routes of the narrow gauge railways: Rio Grande Southern (US 160, SH 145 and SH 62); and the unconnected Ouray and Silverton Branches of the Denver & Rio Grande along US 550 with the Silverton Railroad bridging a part of the gap. Its origin can be traced to the Around the Circle Route promoted by the D&RG.

The San Juan Skyway overlaps with the Trail of the Ancients Scenic and Historic Byway on Colorado State Highway 145 between U.S. Highway 160 and Colorado State Highway 184. The San Juan Skyway connects with the Tracks Across Borders Scenic and Historic Byway at Durango, the Alpine Loop Back Country Byway at Silverton and Ouray, and the Unaweep Tabeguache Scenic Byway at Placerville.

Route description

U.S. Highway 160 

Starting in Durango, Colorado, the largest city on San Juan Skyway, the byway follows U.S. Highway 160 (US 160) west through the town of Mancos to Cortez passing the entrance to Mesa Verde National Park.

State Highway 145 

The byway turns north at Cortez, following State Highway 145 (SH 145) through the town of Dolores and the Dolores River into the San Juan National Forest. The byway passes through Rico, county seat of Dolores County prior to 1941. The old Courthouse still remains. From Rico the byway crosses 10,222 ft (3116 m) Lizard Head Pass and enters the Uncompahgre National Forest. Lizard Head Pass provides views of the  El Diente Peak, the  Mount Wilson, the  Wilson Peak and the pass's namesake, the  Lizard Head Peak. The byway descends near the town of Ophir past the location of the Ophir Loop of the Rio Grande Southern Railroad. A spur road heads off to the mining town turned ski resort of Telluride. The byway follows the San Miguel River to the town of Placerville.

State Highway 62 
The byway turns east at Placerville onto SH 62 and follows it over Dallas Divide. There are many excellent views of the San Juan Mountains, especially of the mountains around the  Mount Sneffels. From the top of the divide the byway descends into the town of Ridgway. The entire route of the byway from Durango to Ridgway roughly follows the route of the Rio Grande Southern Railroad.

U.S. Highway 550 

From Ridgway, the byway turns south onto US 550 following the Uncompahgre River into the Victorian mining town of Ouray. The highway is referred to as the Million Dollar Highway from Ouray south back to Durango. Just past the only tunnel on the route, just south of Ouray, the road crosses over Bear Creek Falls on a bridge at the location of an impassable toll booth on the original road. The Alpine Loop National Back Country Byway, a four wheel drive jeep road, takes off in the gorge south of Bear Creek Falls. Before leaving the gorge the byway passes through a snow shed under the Riverside Slide avalanche zone. A monument stands near here honoring those who have lost their lives in the avalanche, including several snowplow operators. At this point the byway enters Ironton Park, a nice flat valley in contrast to the gorge. The road ascends several switchbacks, or S-curves, past the Idarado mining operation to the  summit of Red Mountain Pass, providing views of Red Mountain and several ghost towns. Back into the San Juan National Forest the highway descends through the Chattanooga Valley to Silverton.

From Silverton the byway passes over the  Molas Pass and the  Coal Bank Pass, descending past the ski resort of Purgatory Resort. From Hermosa, the road parallels the Durango and Silverton narrow gauge railroad before returning to Durango.

History 
The San Juan Skyway was designated as a National Forest Scenic Byway in September 1988. It was later named a Colorado Scenic and Historic Byway in 1989 and an All-American Road in September 1996.

Gallery

See also

History Colorado
List of scenic byways in Colorado
Scenic byways in the United States

Notes

References

External links

America's Byways
America's Scenic Byways: Colorado
Colorado Department of Transportation
Colorado Scenic & Historic Byways Commission
Colorado Scenic & Historic Byways
Colorado Travel Map
Colorado Tourism Office
History Colorado
National Forest Scenic Byways

Colorado Scenic and Historic Byways
All-American Roads
All-American Roads in Colorado
National Forest Scenic Byways
National Forest Scenic Byways in Colorado
San Juan National Forest
Mesa Verde National Park
Transportation in Dolores County, Colorado
Transportation in La Plata County, Colorado
Transportation in Montezuma County, Colorado
Transportation in San Juan County, Colorado
Transportation in San Miguel County, Colorado
Tourist attractions in Colorado
Tourist attractions in Dolores County, Colorado
Tourist attractions in La Plata County, Colorado
Tourist attractions in Montezuma County, Colorado
Tourist attractions in San Juan County, Colorado
Tourist attractions in San Miguel County, Colorado
U.S. Route 160
U.S. Route 550